The Jacana Ecological Education Park is a birdwatching park in Guantian District, Tainan, Taiwan, featuring pheasant-tailed jacanas.

History
The area where the park lies used to be an uncultivated land and two shipping containers. The park was established by the collaboration between bird lovers of the area after 10 years of work.

Transportation
The park is accessible within walking distance southwest of Longtian Station of Taiwan Railways.

See also
 List of tourist attractions in Taiwan

References

External links
  

Birdwatching sites
Parks in Tainan